A. ridleyi may refer to:

 Alseodaphne ridleyi, a plant species endemic to Malaysia
 Amphisbaena ridleyi, the Ridley's worm lizard or the Noronha worm lizard, a reptile species found in Brazil

See also
 Henry Nicholas Ridley